Vitalijus Rumiancevas (born March 15, 1985) is an alpine skier from Lithuania.  He competed for Lithuania at the 2006 Olympics and the 2010 Olympics.  His best result is a 44th place in the slalom in 2006.

References

External links

1985 births
Living people
Lithuanian male alpine skiers
Olympic alpine skiers of Lithuania
Alpine skiers at the 2010 Winter Olympics
Alpine skiers at the 2006 Winter Olympics
Sportspeople from Vilnius